Sancton Wood School is a mixed private day school for children aged 1 to 16 located in Cambridge, Cambridgeshire, England. The school was founded as an independent  primary school in 1976 and opened a senior school department in 1979.

The school was owned by the Sturdy family who also own Cambridge International School and Holme Court School at Cherry Hinton Hall, a specialist school for children with dyslexia and related conditions. It was sold to Minerva Education in March 2014.

References

External links
Sancton Wood School official website

Private schools in Cambridgeshire
Educational institutions established in 1976
1976 establishments in England
Schools in Cambridge